Valentine Efner (May 5, 1776 – November 20, 1865) was a U.S. Representative from New York, serving one term in office from 1835 to 1837.

Biography
Born in Blenheim Hill, near Blenheim, New York, Efner completed preparatory studies and became a farmer.  He served in local offices, including justice of the peace.

War of 1812 
Efner was a major in the New York Militia during the War of 1812.  He was later promoted to lieutenant colonel and second in command of the militia's 104th Regiment.

State legislature 
He served as member of the New York State Assembly in 1829.

Congress 
Efner was elected as a Jacksonian to the Twenty-fourth Congress (March 4, 1835 – March 3, 1837).  

He did not run for reelection in 1836 and returned to farming.

Death 
He died in Blenheim Hill on November 20, 1865, and was buried at Blenheim Hill Cemetery.

References

1776 births
1865 deaths
United States Army officers
Jacksonian members of the United States House of Representatives from New York (state)
19th-century American politicians
Members of the United States House of Representatives from New York (state)